Rakovník is a town in the Central Bohemian Region of the Czech Republic. It has about 15,000 inhabitants. The historic town centre is well preserved and is protected by law as an urban monument zone.

Administrative parts

Rakovník is made up of two town parts, Rakovník I and Rakovník II.

Etymology
According to legend, the name was derived from rak (meaning "crayfish"), which was eaten here during a famine. Therefore this animal was adopted on the town's coat of arms and flag. However, the name was more likely derived from type of vegetation in wetlands by a stream, which gave the name to the stream and later to the town.

Geography
It lies in the Rakovník Uplands, on the border of the Křivoklátsko Protected Landscape Area. The Rakovnický Stream flows through the town.

History
The first written mention of Rakovník is from 1252. Křivoklát was the administrative centre at this time. Rakovník was a market village which together with other villages lies in and adds to the surroundings of Křivoklát Castle.

In the second half of the 16th century, the town was rapidly developing. Town walls with town gates were built, the Church of Holy Trinity with a cemetery was established, and the beer brewing prospered and became known in whole kingdom. In the 17th century, the town suffered from Thirty Years' War, plague and floods, which depopulated the town.

A great development of the town was fulfilled in the 19th century. It was the beginning of independent offices, new houses and a time when new streets were built. Some new roads were built and old roads repaired and Rakovník was connected to the surroundings towns. A grammar school was opened in 1833, where the writer Zikmund Winter used to teach in 1874–1884.

Until 1918, Rakovník – Rakonitz was part of the Austrian monarchy (Austria side after the compromise of 1867), in the district of the same name, one of the 94 Bezirkshauptmannschaften in Bohemia.

With the 20th century the development of social and cultural life increased dramatically. Masaryk's Business Academy, gymnasium and hospital were also built. The two world wars did change life in Rakovník at all. There were no actual fights in Rakovník itself but a lot of people died in concentration camps. The most affected were Jewish families. In 1950 Rakovník became a district town. When Rakovník got over the crises of the wars a lot of people came to the town.

Demographics

Economy
The Rakovník Brewery was founded in 1454. It is one of the oldest breweries in the country. The beers are marketed under the brand Bakalář.

In 1875, Otta's soap factory was opened. It was later called "Rakona" and today it is owned by Procter & Gamble.

In 1883, a ceramic factory was established, known as Rakovnické keramické závody (Rakovník Ceramic Plants). Today the brand is owned by Lasselsberger and it is the biggest producer of sanitary ware in the country.

Sights

The historical core of the town is the 400 metre-long Husovo Square, which is the second longest square in the Czech Republic. On the square is located the 16th-century town hall with a late Baroque façade. The interior of the town hall is decorated with a ceiling fresco depicting the town of Rakovník as it was 250 years ago.

The eastern part of the square is dominated by the high Gothic Deaconal Church of St. Bartholomew, a 14th-century structure. The church was built on the site of an older church dedicated to St. Nicholas. Adjacent to the church stands a bell tower dating from 1495. It is considered as the most precious gothic bell tower in the Czech Republic and one of the most precious in Europe. The bell has a diameter of 1.6 metres.

Other notable buildings in Rakovník include Church of Holy Trinity from the end of the 16th century and Gothic Church of Saint Giles.

The former synagogue serves for cultural and social purposes. It contains the Václav Rabas Gallery.

Notable people

Karel Burian (1870–1924), operatic tenor
Emil Burian (1876–1926), operatic baritone
Miloslav Ransdorf (1953–2016), politician
Joseph Kott (born 1957), spree killer
Pavel Steidl (born 1961), guitarist
Jan Bidrman (born 1966), swimmer and swimming coach
Kateřina Jalovcová (born 1978), operatic mezzo-soprano
Tomáš Kaberle (born 1978), ice hockey player
Jana Pechanová (born 1981), swimmer
Petr Tatíček (born 1983), ice hockey player
Veronika Khek Kubařová (born 1987), actress

Twin towns – sister cities

Rakovník is twinned with:
 Dietzenbach, Germany
 Kościan, Poland
 Kráľovský Chlmec, Slovakia

References

External links

Cities and towns in the Czech Republic
Populated places in Rakovník District